Frances Doel is a writer and story editor, notable for her long association with Roger Corman. Doel was head of the script department at New World Pictures; Jon Davison said that at one stage Doel "wrote just about every first draft of every picture" at New World.

Corman met Doel when looking for an assistant in the mid-'60s. He contacted a tutor at Oxford University and asked him who his finest student was; the tutor suggested Doel. Corman liked to recruit writers from the world of novels and short stories rather than movies and TV, and relied on Doel to make recommendations. She helped discover John Sayles.

In the early '80s, Doel worked at Orion Pictures as an executive.

Select Credits
Big Bad Mama (1974)
Crazy Mama (1975)
Deathsport (1978)
Avalanche (1978)
Raptor (2001)
Dinocroc (2004)
Supergator (2007)
Dinoshark (2010)

References

External links

American women screenwriters
Living people
Year of birth missing (living people)
21st-century American women